Luís Arias may refer to:

 Luis Arias (alpine skier) (1930–1970), Spanish alpine skier
 Luís Arias (boxer) (born 1990), Cuban-American amateur boxer
 Luis Arias (footballer) (born 1991), Argentine defender
 Luis Carlos Arias (born 1985), Colombian footballer
 Luis Arias Graziani (1926–2020), Peruvian military officer and politician
 Luis Arias (volleyball)